Marcel Chauvigné (25 September 1911 – 2 July 1972) was a French rower who competed in the 1936 Summer Olympics.

In 1936 he won the bronze medal as a crew member of the French boat in the coxed four competition.

References

External links
 

1911 births
1972 deaths
French male rowers
Olympic rowers of France
Rowers at the 1936 Summer Olympics
Olympic bronze medalists for France
Olympic medalists in rowing
Medalists at the 1936 Summer Olympics
European Rowing Championships medalists
20th-century French people